Rajesh Payal Rai (born 30 September 1975) is a Nepalese singer and actor. he is known as a singer in the Nepali music industry. He has done playback singing for more than 1500 hundred Nepali movies. In addition, he has recorded several private albums such as Darshan Namaste, Rai is King,Kamana,Jadau,Just For You,Murchana,Baiguni rahechau Mayale,Nigah,Asewaro,Love Letter,Syamuna etc. He has sung [[Japanese language|Japanese],Assamese]  and Bhojpuri songs as well. He performed on a world wide tour and won several music awards from 1995-2015.He also participated in Melancholy, an environmental song conceptualized, written, composed and directed by Environmentalist Nipesh DHAKA and performed by 365 Nepali artists setting the Guinness World Records.

Rai was assaulted and was put on a MMA style chock hold by a intruder during a New Year Eve’s stage performance in The US.

Childhood
Rajesh Payal Rai was born in Khotang district of Nepal. His father is Ratna Rai ( former chief of Khotang District, Ex British Gurkha) and his mother is Sancha Laxmi Rai. He has four brothers and one older sister Namita. He grew up in Buipa, Khotang.

Musical career
Rai recorded "failiyo maya dubo sari" in 1992, after he came to Kathmandu on completion of his high school. Instantly, he was given opportunities to record new songs and perform live on stage programmes.

He has already sung for five hundred Nepali movies, setting a new record in the  history  of the Nepali film industry.

Rajesh , who was known as a modern & filmy singer, has also ventured into folk singing with the release  of his folk album jadow & jadow-2.

In the course of performing on stage shows, Rajesh has travelled to Hongkong (16 times),  South Korea, Australia, Singapore, Malaysia, Japan, U.K., USA, the Gulf countries, and others, to perform for the Nepalese diaspora. He also went on a Nepal tour, singing in all 14 zones.

List of albums

Awards and recognition

|Nati Kaji Yuba Puraskar;
|2018

Videos
https://www.youtube.com/watch?v=50dihJShaqQ
https://www.youtube.com/watch?v=1025EJ2Fyrg

Songs
Darshan Namaste
Namaga Ma Sanga Sahara Namaga
Rai Is King
Maya Nisthuri
Maya Gardainau Re
Ukali Janu
Bhetai Ma Bhayo
Palkiyo Palkiyo
Timi Sanga
Sunkoshi ko cheu
Sarai Beauty
Timro Muskan
Sagar Sari Chokho Maya
Failiyo Maya Dubo Sari
Timle Bato Fereu Arey
Maina Raja Maina Rani
Kyarum
Ukali Ma Jada Jadai
Hini Jane Batuwako
Maile Mayale Diyeko
Timro Tasbir
Nisthuri Lai
Aaja Voli Timile
Timilai Roje
Soi Dhole Soi
Nisthuri Mayale
Lukera Hereu Mayale
Timilai Roje 
dui chulthi badne lai
ma ta marchu ki kya ho thuli
diktel bazar
nai nabhannu la 2
ukali ma jada jadai e mero hajur 2
mohani lagaune
bas ma chaina mero mann
diktel bazar 2
intu mintu london ma
sirai ful sirbandi
timi jasti subasili
khas ta kehi chaina
yeta kulo katda kheri
asato ma satgamay
setamagurali
yani maya
rato galbandi
aakhako nani vitra
fulai fulko mausam timilai
da da da darshan
Yamano (Japanese)

References

External links
 
 
 
 http://www.rajeshpayalrai.com/ retrieved on 29 December 2012
 http://www.filmykhabar.com/pictures/504/12654/
 
 

Living people
1975 births
People from Khotang District
21st-century Nepalese male singers
Nepalese male actors
20th-century Nepalese male singers
Rai people